Ahmad ibn Sulayman al-Muqtadir (or just Moctadir; , Abu Ja'far Ahmad al-Muqtadir bi-Llah ibn Sulayman) was a member of the Banu Hud family who ruled the Islamic taifa of Zaragoza, in what is now Spain, from 1049 to 1081. He was the son of the previous ruler, Al-Mustain I, Sulayman ibn Hud al-Judhami.

References
 List of Muslim rulers

 See Al-Moctadir, RNE, 1984, by Encarnación Ferré.

Emirs of Zaragoza
11th-century rulers in Al-Andalus
Banu Hud
11th-century Arabs